North Leeward is a Vincentian
Parliamentary constituency. It has been represented by Roland Matthews since 2010.

Election
 Election 2015

Source
http://www.caribbeanelections.com/vc/constituencies/NL.asp

Populated places in Saint Vincent and the Grenadines